César Llamas (born 13 July 1985) is a Paraguayan international footballer who plays as a midfielder for 3 de Febrero in the División Intermedia.

Club career
Born in Ciudad del Este, Llamas began his career at 3 de Febrero.

in 2012 Llamas and teammate Gilberto Velázquez joined Rubio Ñu on loan. It was whilst Llamas was at Rubio Ñu that he received a call up to the national team. Llamas concluded his loan stint at Rubio Ñu scoring 2 goals in 16 Primera Division games.

International career
In 2012, Llamas received a call up to the Paraguay national team whilst on loan at Rubio Ñu. On 15 February, Llamas was in Paraguay's starting line up for a friendly against Chile in Luque. He was replaced in the 69th minute by Ariel Bogado as Paraguay defeated Chile 2-0.

References

External links
 
 

1985 births
Living people
Paraguayan footballers
Paraguay international footballers
Association football midfielders
Sportspeople from Ciudad del Este
Club Atlético 3 de Febrero players
Club Rubio Ñu footballers
Paraguayan División Intermedia players
Paraguayan Primera División players